The High Priestess of Athena Polias held the highest religious office in Ancient Athens. She enjoyed great prestige and played an official role which was otherwise uncommon in Ancient Athens.  Several occasions are mentioned when she made her influence known in historical events of importance, and she is known to have influenced offices by recommendation. 
 
She supervised the city cult of Athena based in the Parthenon, and was the chief of the lesser officials, such as the plyntrides, arrephoroi and kanephoroi.  She was the high priest of one of the three cults of the Acropolis of Athens: the other two were the High Priest of Poseidon-Erechtheus and the Priestess of Athena Nike.
 
The most known individual official of this position was Lysimache I.

The office could not have survived the ban of all non-Christian priesthoods during the persecution of pagans in the late Roman Empire.

See also
 High Priestess of Demeter
 Priestess of Hera at Argos

References

 Jeffrey M. Hurwit, The Athenian Acropolis: History, Mythology, and Archaeology
 Joan Breton Connelly, Portrait of a Priestess: Women and Ritual in Ancient Greece
 Garland, Robert, Religion and the Greeks, Bristol Classical Press, London, 1994

Ancient Athenian religious titles
Athena
Ancient Greek priestesses